Ngadjunmaya correctly known as Ngadjumaya is a Pama–Nyungan language of Western Australia that is located in the Goldfields-Esperance region.

Murunitja was apparently a dialect of either Ngadjumaya or of Mirning.

Phonology

Vowels 
Three vowels with length are present:

 /i/ can also be heard as  before a velar /k/, and as [ ~ ] before palatal sounds /ʎ, j/.
 /a/ can also be heard as  when following sounds /w, j/, and as  when following /k/.
 /u/ can also be heard as fronted  when preceding /j/.

Consonants 

 /ɽ/ can be heard as either a tap  or a glide .
 /r/ can be heard as either a trill  or a tap .
 /k/ can also have a voiced allophone of  when in word-medial positions.

References

Mirning languages
Goldfields-Esperance